Fosterage, the practice of a family bringing up a child not their own, differs from adoption in that the child's parents, not the foster-parents, remain the acknowledged parents. In many modern western societies foster care can be organised by the state to care for children with troubled family backgrounds, usually on a temporary basis. In many pre-modern societies fosterage was a form of patronage, whereby influential families cemented political relationships by bringing up each other's children, similar to arranged marriages, also based on dynastic or alliance calculations.

This practice was once common in Ireland, Wales, and Scotland.

Fosterage in Scotland
In medieval Highland society there was a system of fosterage among clan leaders, where boys and girls would leave their parent's house to be brought up in that of other chiefs, creating a fictive bond of kinship that helped cement alliances and mutual bonds of obligation.

In his A Journey to the Western Isles of Scotland (1775), writer Samuel Johnson described the fosterage custom as he saw it practised.

1775 was long past the medieval period, of course. One might also question how much an Englishman with a widely expressed low opinion of Scots who was only in Scotland briefly actually knew about the practice.

Fosterage in Medieval Iceland
Fosterage or "fostering" is frequently referred to in the medieval Sagas of Icelanders. Original family ties and rights of inheritance were not affected, nor was it required for the fostered child to be an orphan or for the biological father to be deceased. An exception to this convention is found in Njáls saga, where Njál Thorgeirsson, a very prominent man, fosters Hoskuld, the son of Thrain Sigfusson, after the death of Thrain in battle.

Portions of Ireland, Scotland and the Hebrides were ruled for long periods of time by Norse invaders during the Middle Ages; but it is unknown which culture was the original source of the custom of fosterage.

Literary fosterage
In Ancient Ireland, ollams taught children either for payment or for no compensation. Children were taught a particular trade and treated like family; their original family ties were often severed.

Fosterage in other cultures
There was similar custom in the Caucasus, called Atalik - :ru:Аталычество.

References

Further reading

Medieval Ireland and Wales
Anderson, Katharine. "Urth Noe e Tat. The Question of Fosterage in High Medieval Wales." North American Journal of Welsh Studies 4:1 (2004): 1-11.
Charles-Edwards, Thomas. Early Irish and Welsh Kinship. Oxford: Clarendon Press, 1993.
Davies, Sir Robert Rees. "Buchedd a moes y Cymry. The manners and morals of the Welsh." Welsh History Review 12 (1984): 155–79.
Fitzsimons, Fiona. "Fosterage and Gossiprid in late medieval Ireland. Some new evidence." In Gaelic Ireland, c.1250-c.1650. Land, lordship and settlement, ed. by Patrick J. Duffy, David Edwards and Elizabeth FitzPatrick. Dublin: Four Courts, 2001. 138–49.
Jaski, Bart. "Cú Chulainn, gormac and dalta of the Ulstermen." Cambrian Medieval Celtic Studies 37 (1999): 1-31.
McAll, C. "The normal paradigms of a woman's life in the Irish and Welsh texts." In The Welsh law of women, ed. by Dafydd Jenkins and Morfydd E. Owen. Cardiff, 1980. 7-22.
Ní Chonaill, Bronagh. "Fosterage. Child-rearing in medieval Ireland." History Ireland 5:1 (1997): 28–31.
Parkes, Peter. "Celtic Fosterage: Adoptive Kinship and Clientage in Northwest Europe." Society for Comparative Study of Society and History 48.2 (2006): 359–95. PDF available online.
Smith, Llinos Beverley. "Fosterage, adoption and God-parenthood. Ritual and fictive kinship in medieval Wales." Welsh History Review 16:1 (1992): 1-35.

Miscellaneous
Parkes, Peter. "Alternative Social Structures and Foster Relations in the Hindu Kush. Milk Kinship Allegiance in Former Mountain Kingdoms of Northern Pakistan." Comparative Studies in Society and History 43:4 (2001): 36.
Parkes, Peter. "Fostering Fealty. A Comparative Analysis of Tributary Allegiances of Adoptive Kinship." Comparative Studies in Society and History 45 (2003): 741–82.
Parkes, Peter. "Fosterage, Kinship, and Legend: When Milk was Thicker than Blood?" Comparative Studies in Society and History 46 (2004): 587–615.
Parkes, Peter. "Milk Kinship in Southeast Europe. Alternative Social Structures and Foster Relations in the Caucasus and the Balkans." Social Anthropology 12 (2004): 341–58.
 McCutcheon, James, 2010. "Historical Analysis and Contemporary Assessment of Foster Care in Texas: Perceptions of Social Workers in a Private, Non-Profit Foster Care Agency". Applied Research Projects. Texas State University Paper 332. http://ecommons.txstate.edu/arp/332

Anglo-Saxon England
Crawford, Sally. Childhood in Anglo-Saxon England. Stroud: Sutton Publishing, 1999. Especially pp. 122–38.

Family law
Scottish culture
Anthropology